The 2012 Vodacom Cup was played between 10 March and 18 May 2012 and was the 15th edition of this annual domestic cup competition.

Competition
There were fifteen teams participating in the 2012 Vodacom Cup competition. These teams were geographically divided into two sections - the Northern Section (with seven teams) and the Southern Section (with eight teams). Teams played all the teams in their section once over the course of the season, either at home or away.

Teams received four log points for a win and two points for a draw. Bonus log points were awarded to teams that scored four or more tries in a game, as well as to teams that lost a match by seven points or less. Teams were ranked by log points, then points difference (points scored less points conceded).

The top four teams in each section qualified for the title play-offs. In the quarter finals, the teams that finished first in each section had home advantage against the teams that finished fourth in that section and the teams that finished second in each section had home advantage against the teams that finished third in that section. The winners of these quarter finals then played each other in the semi-finals, with the higher placed team having home advantage. The two semi-final winners then met in the final.

Teams

Changes from 2011
The  from Namibia withdrew due to financial constraints.

Team listing
The following teams took part in the 2012 Vodacom Cup competition:

Fixtures and results

Northern Section

Round one

Round two

Round three

Round four

Round Five

Round Six

Round Seven

Southern Section

Round one

Round two

Round three

Round four

Round Five

Round Six

Round Seven

Quarter finals

Semi-finals

Final

Winners

Top scorers
The following sections contain only points and tries which have been scored in competitive games in the 2012 Vodacom Cup.

Top points scorers

Source: South African Rugby Union

Top try scorers

Source: South African Rugby Union

See also
 Vodacom Cup
 2012 Currie Cup Premier Division
 2012 Currie Cup First Division

External links

References

Vodacom Cup
2012 in South African rugby union
Vodacom Cup, 2012